Albert McCarthy Boateng, professionally known as  Awaga, is a Ghanaian record producer, sound engineer and disc jockey.

Early life
Boaheng bright  was born on 5th November 2000.

Career 
Awaga began his career in 2014, combining beat making with side mixing and mastering. He has worked with artists such as Stonebwoy, Eye Judah, vvip, Miyaki,  Dawuni X Dawuni(DXD), R2Bees and Dj Killer Fingers, sconzy

Discography 
His major productions include Live In Love (Livingstone EP) by Stonebwoy which was considered for 2017 Grammy Award nominations, "We Made It" by Stonebwoy ft. R2Bees, "Enku Lenu" by Stonebwoy, "Guy Guy" by Stonebwoy ft Bisa Kdei, "Behw3 " by  Dj Killer Fingers ft VVIP & Miyaki, "Anafra" by Miyaki, "Jah Love" by Eye Judah, "Support" by Eye Judah, "Beautiful Soul" by Eye Judah, "Sugar" by Dawuni X Dawuni(DXD) and "Jah Jah" by Netherlands-based Ghanaian reggae / dancehall artiste Dominiq.

In 2017, his first project The Shanti Riddim featured 30 artists from Africa and around the globe.

Recognition

External links
Producedby Awaga at Instagram
Producedby Awaga at Twitter

References

}

Ghanaian record producers
Living people
1994 births